Sigma Iota, Established March 12, 1912 is the first Latin American–based Greek lettered inter-collegiate fraternity in the United States. On December 26, 1931 Sigma Iota Fraternity merged with Phi Lambda Alpha Fraternity to form Phi Iota Alpha.

History

Origins 

Sigma Iota was founded on November 27, 1904 in Louisiana State University as a secret society for Spanish-American students under the name La Colonia Hispano-Americana. Soon after its founding La Colonia Hispano-Americano decided to change its name to Sociedad Hispano-Americana in December 1904.

Founding 
On March 12, 1912, recognizing the benefit of the disciplinary background of a Greek system, the society transformed itself into the very first Latino fraternity, Sigma Iota. This name change allowed for the official transformation from a Latin American social club to Latin American Greek Lettered Fraternity.

Expansion 

Between 1912 and 1925, Sigma Iota expanded very rapidly in the United States, Central America, and Europe. As a result of this, Sigma Iota became the first international Latin American–based fraternity. By 1928, Sigma Iota had lost many of its chapters and therefore sought to stabilize its operations by consolidating its chapters in the United States with a more stationary and well-rooted organization.

Consolidation 
Meanwhile, another fraternity Phi Lambda Alpha, which had been recently founded in 1919 at the University of California, Berkeley was seeking to expand throughout the United States. Sigma Iota Fraternity was in search of revitalizing some of its defunct chapters. Thus both organizations complemented each other and began to work towards the creation of the fraternity now known as Phi Iota Alpha.

On December 26, 1931  Sigma Iota Fraternity merged with Phi Lambda Alpha fraternity to form Phi Iota Alpha.  Phi Sigma Alpha fraternity can also trace its roots back to Sigma Iota.

Former Chapters

See also
Phi Iota Alpha
Phi Lambda Alpha
Phi Sigma Alpha
Union Latino Americana

Footnotes

Phi Iota Alpha
Phi Sigma Alpha
Defunct fraternities and sororities
1912 establishments in Louisiana
Latino fraternities and sororities
Student organizations established in 1912